A turning point, or climax, is the point of highest tension in a narrative work.

Turning Point or Turning Points may refer to:

Film

 The Turning Point, a 1914 silent film starring Caroline Cooke
 The Turning Point (1920 film), an American film starring Katherine MacDonald
 The Turning Point (1945 film), a Soviet film by Fridrikh Markovitch Ermler
 The Turning Point (1952 film), a crime drama starring Edmond O'Brien
 Turning Point (1960 film), an Australian TV play
 The Turning Point (1977 film), a drama starring Shirley MacLaine and Anne Bancroft
 The Turning Point (1978 film), a Soviet drama film directed by Vadim Abdrashitov
 The Turning Point (1983 film), an East German film by Frank Beyer
 Turning Point (2009 Hong Kong film), a spin-off to the 2009 Hong Kong television drama series E.U.
 Turning Point (2009 American film), a documentary film on the travels of Michelle Yeoh
 Turning Point (2012 film), a 2012 drama film by Niyi Towolawi
 The Turning Point (2022 film), an Italian film

Literature
 The Turning Point (book), a 1982 nonfiction book by Fritjof Capra
 Batman: Turning Points, a 5-issue limited series of comics
 The Turning Point, a 1942 autobiography by Klaus Mann
 The Turning Point, a 1988 short story by Isaac Asimov

Music
 Turning Point (American band), an American straight-edge hardcore band
 Turning Point (UK band), a late 1970s UK fusion band

Albums
 Turning Point (Benny Golson album) (1962)
 Turning Point (Mario album) (2004)
 The Turning Point (John Mayall album) (1969)
 The Turning Point (McCoy Tyner album) (1992)
 Turning Point (Lonnie Smith album) (1969)
 Turning Point (Pink Lady album) (1980)
 Turning Point (Chuck Wicks album) (2016)
 Turning Point (Paul Bley album)
 Turning Point, a 1995 album by Rory Block
 Turning Point (Dr SID album) (2010)

Songs
 "Turning Point" (Tyrone Davis song) (1976)
 "Turning Point", a song by Buckwheat Zydeco
 "Turning Point", a 2013 song by Killswitch Engage from Disarm the Descent
 "Turning Point", a song by Mighty Joe Young
 "Turning Point", a 1967 song by Nina Simone from Silk & Soul
 "The Turning Point", a song by Toto from Tambu

Organizations
 Turning Point (institute), a training and counseling institute in Ireland
 Turning Point (charity), a social care organisation in the United Kingdom
 Turning Point Alcohol and Drug Centre, in Melbourne, Australia
 Turning Point USA, an American conservative, right-wing organization
 Turning Point UK, an off-shoot of Turning Point USA

Television
 Turning Point (ministry), carried on TBN, broadcast from San Diego County, United States
 Turning Point, an American dramatic anthology series broadcast on NBC from April to October 1958 consisting of two unsold pilots and reruns from other series
 Turning Point (1991 TV series), an Indian science magazine TV series
 Turning Point (TV program) (1994–1999), an American news program
 Turning Points of History, a History Television series
 Impact Wrestling Turning Point, a professional wrestling pay-per-view event and episode of Impact Wrestling
Turning Point (2004 wrestling), the first event in the series
 Turning Point (2005 wrestling), a professional wrestling pay-per-view event
 Turning Point (2006 wrestling), a professional wrestling pay-per-view event
 Turning Point (2007 wrestling), a professional wrestling pay-per-view event
 Turning Point (2008 wrestling), a professional wrestling pay-per-view event
 Turning Point (2009 wrestling), a professional wrestling pay-per-view event
 Turning Point (2010 wrestling), a professional wrestling pay-per-view event
 Turning Point (2011 wrestling), a professional wrestling pay-per-view event
 Turning Point (2012 wrestling), a professional wrestling pay-per-view event
 Turning Point (2013 wrestling), a professional wrestling episode of Impact Wrestling
 Turning Point (January 2015 wrestling), a professional wrestling pay-per-view event as part of the One Night Only series
 Turning Point (August 2015 wrestling), a professional wrestling episode of Impact Wrestling
 Turning Point (2016 wrestling), a professional wrestling episode of Impact Wrestling
Turning Point (2019 wrestling), a professional wrestling exclusive event on Impact Plus
 "Turning Point" (Amphibia), an episode of Amphibia
 "Turning Point" (Planetes episode)
 "Turning Point" (Spider-Man), an episode of the 1994 animated series
 "The Turning Point" (The Vampire Diaries), a 2009 episode of The Vampire Diaries

Other uses
 Turning Point: Fall of Liberty, a 2008 first-person shooter video game
 Turning point, in mathematics: a stationary point at which the derivative changes sign

See also
 Cursus (classical)
Turning (disambiguation)